Plusiodonta compressipalpis, the moonseed moth, is a moth of the family Erebidae. The species was first described by Achille Guenée in 1852. It is found in North America from Minnesota, extreme southern Canada and Connecticut, south to northern Florida and Texas,tambien en el sur de españa.

The wingspan is 25–33 mm. Adults are on wing from May to September. There are two generations over much of east.

The larvae feed on Menispermum species and snailseed vines.

References

Calpinae
Moths of North America
Moths described in 1852